Heliomera is an extinct genus of trilobite in the order Phacopida. It contains two species. H. albata and H. sol.

External links
 Heliomera at the Paleobiology Database

Cheiruridae
Extinct animals of North America
Devonian trilobites
Paleozoic life of Newfoundland and Labrador
Phacopida genera